Martha Djian (born Lambert on 6 March 1936 at Paris) is a former French athlete, who specialized in the  Long jump and 80m hurdles.

Biography  
She won five French championship athletic championships: two in the Long jump in 1956 and 1958, two in the 80m hurdles in 1956 and 1958, and one in the pentathlon in 1955. She improved seven times the French record in the long jump, bringing it to 6.13m in 1958.

Marthe participated in the 1956 Olympic Games, at Melbourne. A semifinalist in the 80m hurdles, she took fifth place in the Long jump, jumping 5.88m.

Marthe married René Djian (a Semi Finalist in the Olympics in the 800m). Her daughter, Mary, was selected by the French  Combined Athletic Events Team while her youngest son, Francis, became indoor 400m champion of France in 2012 (Veteran). Her granddaughter, Soliane, was Vice-Champion in the  Canadian Junior indoor 200m championship.

prize list  
 French Championships in Athletics   :  
 winner of the long jump 1956 and 1958   
 winner of the 80m hurdles in 1956 and 1958   
 winner of the pentathlon 1955

Records

notes and references  

 Docathlé2003, Fédération française d'athlétisme, 2003, p. 413

External links  
 Olympic profile for Martha Djian at sports-reference.com

1936 births
French female long jumpers
French female hurdlers
French pentathletes
Olympic athletes of France
Athletes (track and field) at the 1956 Summer Olympics
Living people
Athletes from Paris